Michael Young (born 23 August 1966) is a British industrial designer and creative director based in Hong Kong. He works in the areas of product, furniture and interior design with studios in Hong Kong and Brussels. He is known for unconventional use of materials and manufacturing processes, and collaborations with brands such as KEF, Coalesse and MOKE International. He is interested in "how disruption in society always has a design response, because it usually creates a need for things that perform."

Life and career
Young was born in Sunderland, England. He studied at Kingston University and graduated in 1993. Early in his career, he worked with the designer Tom Dixon in London.  In 1994 he started his own studio and operated in England, Iceland, Taiwan before settling in Hong Kong in 2006. Sir Terrance Conran selected Young as the Most Inspirational British Designer (1997).

Young has designed a wide variety of objects such as headphones, glassware, watches, bicycles, furniture, lighting, suitcases, as well as limited edition experimental furniture. He is interested in combining design with technical abilities of the local industry and often works directly with Chinese manufacturers and industrialists. Throughout his career, he worked with clients such as Bacardi, Brionvega, Cappellini, Cathay Pacific, Coca-Cola, Emeco, Giant Bicycles, Gufram, Magis, George Jensen, Trussardi, and Steelcase.

Young has been the Creative Director for 100% Design Shanghai (2010, 2011, 2012), Prior to that he was the Creative Director for 100% Design Tokyo (2008) and Creative Director of the Asian Aerospace show (2009). His work has been exhibited in the Pompidou Museum and the Louvre Museum in Paris, Design Museum in London and solo exhibitions in Kyoto, Miami, Hong Kong, Milan, Paris and Belgium. In 2016, some of Young's work created using aluminum was featured in an exhibit at Grand Hornu in Belgium.

In 2012, Young was approached by Chery subsidiary MOKE International to design a 21st century version of the Moke (styled MOKE). Young has said he considered this project a "call of duty". In 2018 Young re-engineered a continuation model, which is also used as the basis for the Electric Moke.

He has spoken openly about growing up with dyslexia and how this impacted his education and career.

Awards
 2022 Good Design Award, Winner, Omura Series X
 2019 German Design Award, Winner, Templates Watch
 2019 Design Anthology, Finalists, Templates Watch
 2017 Red Dot Design Award, Winner, LessThanFive Chair
 2017 Good Design Award, Gold Winner, Clipsal Iconic
 2017 iF Design Award, Gold Award, LessThanFive Chair
 2017 iF Design Award, Gold Award, Master Series Michael Young Watch
 2016 Red Dot Design Award, Winner, Jougor MY Faucet
 2015 Red Dot Design Award, Winner, TST Sofa
 2013 D&AD Award, Product Design, EOQ
 2014 Silver Award at the 2014 NeoCon World’s Trade Fair for the LessThanFive chair, manufactured by Coalesse
 2012 Red Dot Design Award, Oregon Scientific RA9000
 2011 Japanese Good Design Award
 2010 Red Dot Award
 2009 Red Dot Award
 2009 Best of dining chair by Wallpaper Design Award
 2008 Winner of Eurobike Awards

Publications
 Al(l) Projects in Aluminium by Michael Young (2016)  .
 100 Best Bikes (Laurence King Publishing, 2012) .
 Works in China by John Heskett (2011) 
 1000 New Designs and Where to Find Them (Laurence King Publishing, 2010)  .
 The International Design Yearbook (Laurence King Publishing, 2007) .
 Design Now! (TACHEN, 2007) .
 Desire, the Shape of Things to Come (Gastalen, 2008) .
 Modern Furniture, 150 Years of Design (Trandem Verlag GmbH, 2009; H.F. Ullmann. 2012)

Examples of Youngs' works

References

External links
 
 Steelcase Interview

1966 births
Living people
People from the City of Sunderland
Alumni of Kingston University
English industrial designers
English furniture designers
British industrial designers
British furniture designers
Industrial designers
Industrial design
Designers
People with dyslexia
Designers